The 1991–92 Primera División season was the second category of the Spanish basketball league system during the 1991–92 season. It was the second played with the name of Primera División.

Format
16 teams played this season.

Regular Season
League of 16 teams in a single group where they play all against all in two rounds.

Second Phase
Group A1, made up of those classified in 1st, 4th, 5th and 8th positions.
Group A2, made up of those classified in the 2nd, 3rd, 6th and 7th positions.
Group B1, made up of those classified in positions 9th, 12th, 13th and 16th.
Group B2, made up of those classified in the 10th, 11th, 14th and 15th positions.

Champions playoff
The winners of groups A1 and A2 play a best-of-5 tie, the winner of which goes directly to the ACB League and the loser goes to the promotion playoffs, starting in the second round.

Promotion playoffs
Teams classified between 2nd and 4th place in groups A1 and A2 play three rounds of knockout rounds for promotion to the best of 5 games. From the second round they are joined by the loser of the Champions playoff. The winner goes up to the ACB League.

Relegation playoffs
The 2nd and 3rd classified of groups B1 and B2 play a best-of-5 tie with the winners remaining and the losers relegated.
The last 2 classified in groups B1 and B2 go directly to Segunda División.

Teams

Promotion and relegation (pre-season) 
A total of 16 teams contested the league, including 10 sides from the 1990–91 season, two relegated from the 1990–91 ACB, one promoted from the Segunda División and three Wild Cards.

Teams relegated from Liga ACB
Caja Bilbao
CB Canarias

Teams promoted from Segunda División
Basketmar Coruña

Wild Cards
CB Cáceres
Unicaja Melilla
CAB Obradoiro

Teams that resigned to participate
CD Cajamadrid transfers its rights to Juventud Alcalá.
CAB Cartagena was replaced by Lotus Santa Coloma, who obtained a relegation place the previous season.

Venues and locations

Regular season

Second phase

Group A1

Group A2

Group B1

Group B2

PlayOffs

Champions playoff
The winner is promoted to Liga ACB.

Promotion playoffs
The winner is promoted to Liga ACB.

Relegation playoffs

|}

Final standings

References

External links
League at JM Almenzar website
hispaligas.net

Primera División B de Baloncesto
1991–92 in Spanish basketball
Second level Spanish basketball league seasons